"I Bet You They Won't Play This Song on the Radio" is a song performed by  Eric Idle, an English comedian and member of Monty Python. It mocks radio censorship of words considered inappropriate.  Another similar song, also by Idle, is "The FCC Song", whose refrain "Fuck you very much" is directed at the U.S. Federal Communications Commission.  "I Bet You They Won't Play This Song on the Radio" touches on the same subject, but includes bleepings and comic sound-effect noises (such as "Cha-ching" or "Yeeaagh!") in place of actual profanity.

The song first appeared on Monty Python's Contractual Obligation Album, and later appeared on two compilation albums: disc two of The Final Rip Off and the E.P. Always Look on the Bright Side of Life.

See also
FCC Song

References

British songs
1980 songs
Monty Python songs
Songs written by Eric Idle
Songs about radio
Songs about censorship